Dr. Deerghasi Vizai Bhaskar is a Telugu playwright, poet, short story writer, and translator. He published a thesis on Telugu theater and several columns on the development of Telugu theater.

Birth, early life 
Vizai Bhaskar, born in 1958, in Ampolu village of Srikakulam district of the Indian state of Andhra Pradesh. His interest in theater made him pursue academics in the field of theater, and he studied Bertolt Brecht's influence on Telugu drama.

Literature 
Vizai Bhaskar emphasised socio-political themes in his plays and used metaphors from the Vedas, Upanishads, and Puranas. Kinchit Bhogam, Gandhi Jayanti, Jeevannatakam, Rtvik, Kurchi, and Bommalu Cheppina Bhajagovindam are some of his popular plays. These have been translated to English, Hindi, Kannada, and Malayalam.

Recognition 
Vizai Bhaskar's dramas have been adopted by the Karnataka Nataka Akademi in the year 2010 to be played on stage as part of a Kannada-Telugu theater collaboration. Vizia Bhaskar mentions in an interview with The Hindu that the play Gandhi Jayanthi was translated into seven languages in addition to English and that his drama Puli Swari was staged 150 times.

Awards 

 Nandi Award : Best writer award for the years 1999, 2000, 2003, 2004, 2005, 2009 and 2011.
 Sri Potti Sreeramulu Telugu University award in 2004 
 Sangeeta Natak Kala Academy award for the year 2010 for best playwright.
 Delhi Telugu Akademi award for excellence in Telugu literature for the year 2011
 Gurajada Sahitee Puraskaram for the year 2012 conferred by Government of Andhra Pradesh.

References

External links 
 Personal Website 
 Vizai Bhaskar's interview in DD Saptagiri, national network of India
 Kaalakutam – A Pragmatic Portraiture Of Political Power by A. Satya Phani Kumari, Dr. Y. Somalatha
 Deergasi Vizai Bhaskar's Ruthwik A Social Drama by Sk Rahena
 A Deeper Insight on Social Apprehension and Humanity – A Critical Evaluation of Vizai Bhaskar's Ruthwik by Dr.D.Sravana Jyothi
 The Element Of Social Concern In The Plays Of Vizai Bhaskar - Critical Analysis by Y. Saloman Raju
 Dr VizaiBhaskar's Dramas A Call for Social Change by Sujata Agarwal
 Socio-Political Concerns in Vizai Bhaskar's Kalakootam by Mani N Bacchu
 Sootha Theatre, A Critical Analysis. by Ch Anantha Sai Lakshmi
 Politics and Democracy in The Return of Gandhi by Dr. G. Srilatha
 SOOTHA RANGASTHALI A Review by Dr. Ch. Rajeswari and A. Neeraja Padma
 The Role of Women Characters in select plays of Vizai Bhaskar A Study by Dr. Haribabu Thammineni
 The Chair A Critical Study by R. Deepa
 Critical Appreciation of Riding The Tiger of Vizai Bhaskar by A.V.Padmavathi and Dr.R.Polireddy

Living people
1958 births
Telugu-language dramatists and playwrights
Telugu poets
People from Srikakulam district
Recipients of the Sangeet Natak Akademi Award